Destination Software Inc., better known as DSI Games, was an American video game publisher and video game developer. Based in Moorestown, New Jersey, DSI is best known for publishing SNOOD. DSI published titles for the Nintendo DS, Wii, Game Boy Advance and PlayStation 2.

In December 2007, Destination Software became the North American branch of Zoo Games after being acquired by GreenScreen Interactive Software (along with Zoo Digital Publishing) and renamed Zoo Publishing, Inc. The company no longer produced titles under its previous Destination Software name.  Between 2008 and 2011 Zoo Publishing released around 60 games. In 2013 all indiePub and Zoo companies were closed.

Games

References

External links
 Archived copy of dsi-games.com on the Wayback Machine
 Archived copy of dsigames.com on the Wayback Machine
 Moby Games site

Video game publishers
Video game development companies
Defunct companies based in New Jersey
Companies based in Burlington County, New Jersey
Moorestown, New Jersey
Video game companies established in 2001
Video game companies disestablished in 2007
Defunct video game companies of the United States
2001 establishments in New Jersey
2007 disestablishments in New Jersey